The 2011–12 South West Peninsula League season was the fifth in the history of the South West Peninsula League, a football competition in England, that feeds the Premier Division of the Western Football League. The league had been formed in 2007 from the merger of the Devon County League and the South Western League, and is restricted to clubs based in Cornwall and Devon. The Premier Division of the South West Peninsula League is on the same level of the National League System as the Western League Division One.

Bodmin Town won the league for the third time, but did not apply for promotion. Buckland Athletic did apply, and were accepted into the Premier Division of the Western League.

Premier Division

The Premier Division featured 20 teams, the same as the previous season, after Wadebridge Town were relegated to Division One West. One new club joined the league:

Camelford, champions of Division One West.

League table

Division One East
Division One East consisted of seventeen clubs, increased from sixteen the previous season.
Okehampton Argyle were transferred back from Division One West, and Sidmouth Town joined from the Devon and Exeter League.
Bickleigh resigned from the league shortly before the season started.
Galmpton Gents changed their name back to Galmpton United.

Division One West
Division One West consisted of seventeen clubs, increased from sixteen the previous season.
Camelford were promoted to the Premier Division, and Okehampton Argyle were transferred back to Division One East. Wadebridge Town were relegated from the Premier Division, Helston Athletic were promoted from the Cornwall Combination and St Dennis were promoted from the East Cornwall League.

References

External links
 South West Peninsula League

South West Peninsula League
10